Yarli (Yardli) was a dialect cluster of Australian Aboriginal languages spoken in northwestern New South Wales and into Northeastern South Australia individually Malyangapa (Maljangapa), Yardliyawara, and Wadikali (Wardikali, Wadigali). Bowern (2002) notes Karenggapa as part of the area, but there is little data.

Tindale (1940) groups Wanjiwalku & Karenggapa together with Wadikali & Maljangapa as the only languages in NSW that are behind the 'Rite of Circumcision' border - which suggests Wanjiwalku to also be part of the Yarli area.

Classification
The three varieties are very close. Hercus & Austin (2004) classify them as the Yarli branch of the Pama–Nyungan family. Dixon (2002) regards the three as dialects of a single language. Bowern (2002) excludes them from the Karnic languages, where they had sometimes been classified.

References

Pama–Nyungan languages
Extinct languages of New South Wales